TiungSAT-1 is the first Malaysian microsatellite. The satellite is developed through the technology transfer and training programme between Astronautic Technology Sdn Bhd (ATSB) Malaysia and Surrey Satellite Technology Ltd., United Kingdom. TiungSAT-1 was launched aboard Dnepr rocket from Baikonur Cosmodrome, Kazakhstan on 26 September 2000.

In May 2002, the amateur radio payload on the satellite was designated Malaysian OSCAR-46, or MO-46.

References

External links 

 NSSDC ID: 2000-057D, NSSDC Master Catalog
 Tiungsat 1 (MySat 1, Oscar 46, MO 46), skyrocket.de
 TIUNGSAT 1 Satellite details 2000-057D NORAD 26548, N2YO.com

Satellites orbiting Earth
Spacecraft launched in 2000
Amateur radio satellites
Satellites of Malaysia